The 2023 Duke Blue Devils football team will represent Duke University in the 2023 NCAA Division I FBS football season as a member of the Atlantic Coast Conference (ACC). The Blue Devils are led by head coach Mike Elko, in his second year, and play their home games at Wallace Wade Stadium in Durham, North Carolina.

Schedule
Duke and the ACC announced the 2023 football schedule on January 30, 2023. The 2023 season will be the conference's first season since 2004, that its scheduling format just includes one division. The new format sets Duke with three set conference opponents, while playing the remaining ten teams twice in an (home and away) in a four–year cycle. The Blue Devils three set conference opponents for the next four years is; NC State, North Carolina, and Wake Forest.

Rankings

Coaching staff

References

Duke
Duke Blue Devils football seasons
Duke Blue Devils football